Kowsari or Kosari is a surname.

People with the name include:

 Baran Kosari (born 1985), Iranian actress
 Khider Kosari (Khider Mohammad Rasheed, 1969–1993), Kurdish Islamist rebel and poet
 Esmaeil Kousari (born 1955), Iranian military officer and politician

See also
 Kowsar (disambiguation)